Chionolaena is a genus of flowering plants in the family Asteraceae. It is native to tropical and subtropical regions in the Americas, with species occurring discontinuously from central Mexico to southern Brazil. About half occur in southeastern Brazil.

Plants in this genus are small, woody shrubs and subshrubs. They have leaves with rolled edges, phyllaries with white to opaque tips, and staminate central florets. The plants grow in high-elevation habitat types.

 Species

References

Asteraceae genera
Gnaphalieae